HMS Test was a Laird-type River-class destroyer purchased by the Royal Navy under the 1908–1909 Naval Estimates in December 1909. Named after the River Test in southern England by the city of Southampton, she was the first ship to carry this name in the Royal Navy.

Construction
Built on speculation, she was laid down in December 1904 at the Cammell Laird shipyard at Birkenhead and launched on 6 May 1905. She was purchased and completed in December 1909.

Pre-War
Upon commissioning she was assigned to the 3rd Destroyer Flotilla based at Harwich. She remained until displaced by a Basilisk-class destroyer by May 1912. She went into reserve assigned to the 5th Destroyer Flotilla of the 2nd Fleet with a nucleus crew.

On 30 August 1912 the Admiralty directed all destroyer classes were to be designated by alpha characters starting with the letter 'A'. The ships of the River class were assigned to the E class. After 30 September 1913, she was known as an E-class destroyer and had the letter ‘E’ painted on the hull below the bridge area and on either the fore or aft funnel.

World War I
In early 1914 when displaced by G-class destroyers she joined the 9th Destroyer Flotilla based at Chatham tendered to HMS St George. The 9th Flotilla was a patrol flotilla tasked with anti-submarine and counter-mining patrols in the Firth of Forth area.

On 16 December 1914 under division leader Doon along with Waveney, Test and Moy were sent to patrol off Hartlepool. During the German battle-cruiser raid on Hartlepool, she was undamaged and suffered no casualties during the engagement.

In August 1915 with the amalgamation of the 9th and 7th Flotillas she was deployed to the 7th Destroyer Flotilla based at the River Humber. She remained employed on the Humber Patrol participating in counter-mining operations and anti-submarine patrols for the remainder of the war.

Disposition
In 1919 Test was paid off and laid up in reserve awaiting disposal. On 30 August 1919 she was sold to Loveridge and Company for breaking.

Pennant numbers

References

Bibliography

 

River-class destroyers
Ships built on the River Mersey
1905 ships